Yunnan Provincial Museum is located in Kunming, on Guangfu Road. It houses an exhibition centered on Yunnan's ethnic minorities, as well as a collection of artifacts from tomb excavations at Jinning on the southern rim of Lake Dian.

The old museum is on Wuyi Road in Wuhua District. The new museum is located at No.6393 of Guangfu Road in Guandu District, which has officially opened its door to the public on May 18, 2015.

See also
 List of museums in China
 Kunming Museum

External links

 

Museums in Kunming
Ethnic museums in China
National first-grade museums of China